The following is a list of films originally produced and/or distributed theatrically by Paramount Pictures and released in the 1980s.

References

External links
 Paramount Pictures Complete Library

 1980-1989
American films by studio
1980s in American cinema
Lists of 1980s films